Roberto Castrillo (born 30 June 1941) is a Cuban sport shooter and Olympic medalist. He won a bronze medal in skeet shooting at the 1980 Summer Olympics in Moscow. He also competed at the 1972 Summer Olympics and the 1976 Summer Olympics.

References

1941 births
Living people
Cuban male sport shooters
Skeet shooters
Shooters at the 1972 Summer Olympics
Shooters at the 1976 Summer Olympics
Shooters at the 1980 Summer Olympics
Olympic bronze medalists for Cuba
Olympic shooters of Cuba
Olympic medalists in shooting
Medalists at the 1980 Summer Olympics
Pan American Games medalists in shooting
Pan American Games silver medalists for Cuba
Shooters at the 1983 Pan American Games
Shooters at the 1967 Pan American Games
Medalists at the 1983 Pan American Games
20th-century Cuban people